USCGC Sycamore (WAGL-268), a 114-foot, 230-ton river buoy tender, was one of three such vessels (her sisters were the  and ) built to replace the stern paddlewheel steamers that the Coast Guard decided were too expensive to maintain.

References

Ships of the United States Coast Guard
Sycamore-class buoy tenders
1941 ships
Ships built in Iowa